Helmstadt-Bargen is a town in the district of Rhein-Neckar in Baden-Württemberg in Germany.

The town has three schools and 2 concert venues.
Of the three places that have been offered as home of Dr. Faust, Helmstadt is the one mentioned in contemporary sources (in 1513 and 1528). The one other place given for Faust in contemporary sources is Heidelberg, but Mutianus Rufus in October 1513 mentions both Heidelberg and Helmstadt, apparently meaning Heidelberg to identify the general region. Contemporary sources therefore are consistent with Helmstadt being Faust's home.

References 

Rhein-Neckar-Kreis